Mitzi Kapture (born Mitzi Gaynor Donahue; May 2, 1962) is an American actress, known for her role as Sgt. Rita Lee Lance in the CBS/USA Network crime drama series Silk Stalkings from 1991 to 1995.

Life and career
Kapture was born in Yorba Linda, California, and raised in Atlanta, Georgia. She began her career in films such as Lethal Pursuit (1988), Angel III: The Final Chapter (1988), Liberty & Bash (1989), and The Vagrant (1992), before moving to television. She gained exposure with her first regular series role as Sergeant Rita Lee Lance in the television series Silk Stalkings. Silk Stalkings premiered on CBS and USA, but later moved solely to USA Network. The show aired for eight seasons and became USA network's highest-rated original drama series. She played Rita, the other half of the two "Sams" for almost five years. Paired with Rob Estes, who played Sergeant Chris Lorenzo, Kapture gained recognition along with her co-star. Sergeant Lance eventually became Lieutenant Lance by the time Kapture left the series in 1995 to have her first daughter. During her time with the series, Kapture also directed episodes.

Kapture returned to television in 1997, starring in two made-for-USA-Network movies. She played lead roles in USA Pictures Originals telemovies, Perfect Crime (based on a true story, also called Hide and Seek: The Joanne Jensen Story), which also starred Jasmine Guy, and His Bodyguard with Robert Guillaume. She returned to series television in a lead role on Baywatch as Alexis Ryker.

From 2002 through 2005, she played the seductive Anita Hodges on the CBS daytime soap opera The Young and the Restless, credited as Mitzi Kapture Donahue. She also starred in the made-for-Lifetime television movie Night of Terror, which premiered March 26, 2007. In her latest film, she played the role of a therapist specializing in autism in the independent feature God's Ears, released in 2008 and on DVD in 2012.
In 2010, she guest-starred in an episode of the CBS sitcom Rules of Engagement.

Filmography

References

Specific
 UCLA (2004) David Koepp Honored With Distinguished Achievement in Screenwriting Award by UCLA School of Theater, Film and Television; retrieved November 29, 2004

External links
 

1962 births
20th-century American actresses
21st-century American actresses
Living people
People from Yorba Linda, California
American television actresses
American stage actresses
American soap opera actresses
American film actresses
Actresses from California